Noughty by Nature (abbreviated as NBN) is the third commercial mixtape by British rapper Digga D. It was released on 15 April 2022 by CGM. It features guest appearances from Still Brickin', Rack5, Dodgy, Horrid1, AJ Tracey, and Maverick Sabre, and American rappers B-Lovee, Moneybagg Yo, and Hotboii. The extended edition adds a further guest appearance from Arrdee. The mixtape debuted atop the UK Albums Chart, becoming Digga D's first number-one album.

Background
Digga D described this mixtape saying "This is the first time in my life I feel free. Free from all the hassle from police, haters, probation and crazy entanglements. Really been living a movie and this mixtape is just a scene from it." He told XXL that Noughty by Nature will be his third and final mixtape before getting started on his debut studio album.

Singles and promotion
On 13 August 2021, Digga D released the single "Wasted" featuring ArrDee. The single peaked at number 6 on the UK Singles Chart. On 9 September, he released the song "2K17", which charted at number 26 on the UK Singles Chart. He also appeared on the single "Keep Talkin" with Sav'O and Horrid1 on 28 September. On 21 October, he released the single "Red Light Green Light", with the music video referencing the television series Squid Game. The single charted at number 17 on the UK Singles Chart.

On 20 January, Digga D released the single "Pump 101" featuring Still Brickin. On 3 March, he released the single "G Lock" featuring American rapper Moneybagg Yo. He released three freestyles in March titled "A Lil Promo", "Life of a Real G", and a freestyle during an appearance the radio station On the Radar in the United States. On 31 March, Digga D released the third single from the mixtape "What You Reckon", featuring American rapper B-Lovee. 

On 7 April, the fourth single was released titled "Hold It Down". On 12 April, he released the song "Amelia Amelia" and revealed the tracklist of the mixtape in the music video. He also released music videos for "Main Road" and "Alter Ego".

Artwork
On 3 March, 2022, Digga D announced the mixtape and revealed the artwork with silhouettes of the characters. The characters were revealed in different music videos released to promote the mixtape.

Critical reception

Noughty by Nature was met with widespread critical acclaim from music critics. The Guardian scored the mixtape 4 out of 5 stars and noted the versatility on the mixtape, saying he achieved this under extraordinary circumstances due to a criminal behaviour order that prevents him from rapping about violence. The mixtape contains influence of early 2000's hip hop, with the writer saying "Digga is clearly trying to expand beyond drill to encompass trap and even pop balladry. This is sometimes to the album’s detriment. Its most thrilling moments come when it sticks fast to drill's minimal and now distinctively British blueprint, rather than looking back towards the US." 

NME also rated the mixtape a 4 out of 5 stars, claiming it features some of Digga D's best and deepest work, saying "Once upon a time, Digga D's career was riddled with ifs and buts, yet he keeps growing musically, challenging what drill music can be. On Noughty by Nature, he confirms he's a genre juggernaut, but in wearing his heart a little more on his sleeve, he's also evolving right in front of us." Clash gave the mixtape a 9/10, calling Digga D an icon, saying the project "truly shines when he does what he does best. Speedy wordplay against a club-thumping beat is what makes this a memorable mixtape."

Track listing

Charts

References

2022 mixtape albums
Digga D albums